The  was a tilting electric multiple unit (EMU) train type operated by East Japan Railway Company (JR East) on Chuo Main Line Super Azusa limited express services in Japan from 1993 to 2018. First introduced in December 1993 (initially on Azusa services), a total of 60 vehicles were built, formed as five eight-car main sets (numbers S1 to S5) and five four-car supplementary (numbers S21 to S25) sets.

Concept

Operations
At the time of withdrawal in 2018, the E351 series trains were used on the following services:
 Super Azusa limited express services (3 December 1994 - 16 March 2018) - through service to the Oito Line withdrawn 12 March 2010
 Chūō Liner rapid services (15 March 2008 - 16 March 2018) - Commuter services on the Chuo Main Line
Other services previously operated by the series include:
 Azusa limited express services (23 December 1993 - 2 December 1994)
 Ohayo Liner Shinjuku / Home Liner Odawara rapid services (16 March 1996 - 14 March 2008) - Commuter services on the Tokaido Main Line

Formations

The fleet consisted of five four-car sets (S21–S25) and five eight-car sets (S1–S5), formed as shown below, with car 1 (car 5) at the Shinjuku or Tokyo end.

4-car sets S21–S22

 Car 4 had a retracting gangway.
 Car 2 was fitted with a PS31 single-arm pantograph.
 Cars 2 and 4 were fitted with toilets.

4-car sets S23–S25

 Car 4 had a retracting gangway.
 Car 2 was fitted with a PS31 single-arm pantograph.
 Cars 2 and 4 were fitted with toilets.

8-car sets S1–S2

 Car 5 had a retracting gangway.
 Cars 6 and 10 were each fitted with a PS31 single-arm pantograph.
 Cars 6, 8, 10, and 12 were fitted with toilets.

8-car sets S3–S5

 Car 5 had a retracting gangway.
 Cars 6 and 10 were each fitted with a PS31 single-arm pantograph.
 Cars 6, 8, 10, and 12 were fitted with toilets.

Original set formations
When first delivered, the two pairs of sets were numbered and formed as shown below, with car 1 at the Shinjuku end.

Interior
Both standard class and Green (first) class seating were arranged 2+2 abreast.

E351 series trains were made entirely no-smoking on 18 March 2007.

History

Introduction
Two pairs of first-batch sets (S1+S21 and S2+S22) were delivered in 1993, and were introduced on Azusa services from 23 December 1993.

Super Azusa introduction
From the start of the revised timetable on 3 December 1994, four return Azusa workings were upgraded and rebranded as Super Azusa, operating between Shinjuku and Matsumoto or Minami-Otari using E351 series equipment.

2nd batch
Three pairs of second-batch sets were delivered in 1995, and the first two pairs of sets (S1+S21 and S2+S22) were modified to bring them up to production specifications at JR East's Nagano Workshop and Nippon Sharyo, respectively, in March 1996. Modifications included replacing the original PS26C lozenge-type pantographs with PS31 single-arm pantographs, and renumbering the cars in the -1000 series. From the start of the revised timetable on 16 March 1996, the number of Super Azusa services using E351 series equipment was increased from four return trips daily to eight return trips.

1997 Ōtsuki Station collision
On 12 October 1997, the down Super Azusa 13 service from Shinjuku to Matsumoto (formed of sets S3+S23) was involved in a collision with a 201 series local train that had overrun a red signal while passing through Ōtsuki Station. Several cars were derailed and one car overturned. Five cars of set S3 were ultimately cut up on site, and replacement car bodies ordered from Hitachi. The rebuilt vehicles retained their original running numbers.

Withdrawal 
The replacement of the E351 series trains by new E353 series EMUs began on 23 December 2017, with the entire fleet phased out from regular passenger services on 16 March 2018.

A special final run service was held on 7 April 2018 to commemorate the E351 series sets' retirement, after which the sets were officially withdrawn.

After their withdrawal, the trains were transferred to Nagano General Rolling Stock Center for scrapping. No E351 series cars have been preserved.

Build details
The individual build details for the fleet are as shown below.

References

External links

 JR E351 Super Azusa 

Electric multiple units of Japan
Tilting trains
East Japan Railway Company
Hitachi multiple units
Train-related introductions in 1993
Nippon Sharyo multiple units
1500 V DC multiple units of Japan